Voska is a surname. Notable people with the surname include:

 Emanuel Viktor Voska (1875–1960), American intelligence officer
 Matt Voska, American pilot and founder of Flytenow
 Václav Voska (1918–1982), Czech actor

See also
 Voskan

Czech-language surnames